"Spending My Time" is a song by Swedish duo Roxette, released as the fourth single from their third studio album, Joyride (1991). It was written by Per Gessle and Mats Persson, and produced by Clarence Öfwerman. The single attained moderate success, reaching the top ten in Germany and Italy, and the top twenty in Australia, Austria, Belgium, Canada, Finland, Sweden and Switzerland, while peaking at number twenty-two on the UK Singles Chart and thirty-two on the Billboard Hot 100 in the United States.

A remix was created by M.C. King Carli and Dr. Renault (pseudonyms used by Öfwerman & Anders) at EMI Studios in Stockholm, Sweden, in July 1991, and was included on the single. A Spanish version of the song, titled "Un Día Sin Ti" ("A Day Without You"), was released in 1996 as the lead single from the duo's Spanish-language compilation album Baladas en Español.

Composition and style
The verse is written in the key of A (F#min - D - E ... B - Bmin), whereas the chorus is in the key of E (E - B - C#min - A - F#min - B...).

Critical reception
AllMusic editor Bryan Buss noted "the quiet desperation" of the song in his review of Joyride. Larry Flick from Billboard described the song as an "acoustic-anchored pop/rock ballad" and noted further that the "memorable melody and throaty vocals by Marie Fredriksson are [the] track's true highlights." Swedish newspaper Expressen called it a "high-pitched melancholy ballad". Dave Sholin from the Gavin Report wrote, "In a Top 40 world starved for pop music, Per and Marie can be considered a delicacy. No matter what the tempo, all their songs contain melodies that win listeners over immediately. Hearing this latest release makes it easy to understand why they've established such a large and loyal international following."

A reviewer from Göteborgsposten complimented the song for its "strong" chorus. Kim Såtvedt from Norwegian newspaper Laagendalsposten also complimented Roxette for their "beautiful ballads" like "Spending My Time", noting it as "enthralling". Pan-European magazine Music & Media described it as a "melancholic ballad". Brendon Veevers from Renowned for Sound called it "the greatest musical creation of all time", adding the song as "such an emotional charged and exquisitely delivered song". Rolling Stones J.D. Considine noted Fredriksson's "vocal fire-work" on the song. Miranda Sawyer from Smash Hits commented, "Yes, it's a hankies-up ballad with a thumping Swedish beat."

Commercial performance
The song was not as commercially successful as the duo's preceding singles. It peaked at number thirty-two on the Billboard Hot 100 in the US, ending a run of five consecutive top two singles on the chart. In the liner notes of their 1995 greatest hits compilation Don't Bore Us, Get to the Chorus!, Per Gessle said he believed that "Spending My Time" was "going to be our biggest hit ever, which might have happened if not our American record company had fired a lot of... ah, never mind." At the end of 1991, EMI merged with other record companies to form EMI Records Group North America. The merger resulted in the new company firing over a hundred members of staff, and saw Roxette receiving little support from the new label. The song also peaked at number nine in Canada.

Music video
The accompanying music video for "Spending My Time" was directed by American director Wayne Isham and depicts singer Marie Fredriksson at multiple places in a house, such as sitting by a window, lying in bed, sitting on a couch and at a table. Gessle also appears occasionally playing the guitar.

Track listings
All songs were written by Per Gessle and Mats Persson except "The Sweet Hello, the Sad Goodbye", written by Gessle.

 Cassette and 7-inch single
 "Spending My Time" – 4:39
 "The Sweet Hello, The Sad Goodbye" – 4:49

UK 7-inch single
 "Spending My Time" – 4:39
 "Listen to Your Heart" (Swedish Single Version) – 5:10

12-inch single
 "Spending My Time" (Electric Dance Remix) – 5:27
 "Spending My Time" – 4:39
 "The Sweet Hello, The Sad Goodbye" – 4:49

CD single
"Spending My Time" – 4:39
"The Sweet Hello, The Sad Goodbye" – 4:49
"Spending My Time" (Electric Dance Remix) – 5:27
"Spending My Time" (Electric Dance Remix/Instrumental) – 5:27

UK CD single
 "Spending My Time" – 4:39
 "The Sweet Hello, The Sad Goodbye" – 4:49
 "Spending My Time" (Electric Dance Remix) – 5:27
 "Listen to Your Heart" (7-inch Edit) – 4:06

Personnel
Credits are adapted from the liner notes of The Ballad Hits.

Studios
 Recorded in July 1990 at EMI Studios (Stockholm, Sweden)
 Mixed at EMI Studios

Musicians
 Marie Fredriksson – lead and background vocals
 Per Gessle – background vocals, mixing
 Anders Herrlin – programming and engineering
 Jonas Isaacson – acoustic and electric guitars
 Clarence Öfwerman – keyboards, programming and production
 Alar Suurna – mixing, engineering
 Clarence Öfwerman – mixing

Charts

Weekly charts

Year-end charts

Release history

"Un Día Sin Ti" (1996)

Roxette released a Spanish-language compilation album, Baladas en Español, in 1996. It consisted of twelve of their down-tempo singles and album tracks, which were translated by Spanish songwriter Luis Gomez-Escolar. This album was only released in Spanish and Portuguese-speaking territories. A translated version of "Spending My Time", titled "Un Día Sin Ti" ("A Day Without You"), was released in November 1996 as the album's lead single.

Music video
A new music video was filmed for this version of the song. It was created by Jonas Åkerlund, who would go on to direct a total of twelve music videos for the duo. It features close-up shots of Marie singing and Per playing guitar, interspersed with clips of a woman descending into alcoholism, and suggestively sniffing a table counter.

Track listings
All music was composed by Per Gessle and Mats Persson. Lyrics were written by Gessle. Spanish lyrics were written by Luis G. Escolar.

 CD single (EU 8652672)
 "Un Día Sin Ti" ("Spending My Time") – 4:39
 "Tímida" ("Vulnerable") – 4:44

Charts

References

1990s ballads
1991 singles
1991 songs
EMI Records singles
Music videos directed by Wayne Isham
Pop ballads
Rock ballads
Roxette songs
Songs about heartache
Songs written by Mats Persson (musician)
Songs written by Per Gessle
Torch songs